The European Union Statistics on Income and Living Conditions, (also known as European Union Survey on Income and Living Conditions) abbreviated EU-SILC, is a survey department of the EU.
It replaced in 2004 the European Community Household Panel (ECHP), which covered the years 1994–2003. The EU-SILC includes only minor changes relative to its predecessor the ECHP; most importantly, it significantly expands the number of countries included in the sample.

References
 

Demography
Euthenics
International medical and health organizations